Tsundi is a rural locality (a selo) in Tsudni-Shabdukhsky Selsoviet, Gumbetovsky District, Republic of Dagestan, Russia. The population was 368 as of 2010.

Geography 
Tsundi is located 14 km southwest of Mekhelta (the district's administrative centre) by road. Shabdukh and Kizhani are the nearest rural localities.

References 

Rural localities in Gumbetovsky District